Nate Schatzline is an American politician and former pastor who is a member of the Texas House of Representatives for District 93.

Career 
Schatzline is from Fort Worth, Texas. He is the director of operations of The Justice Reform, an anti-human trafficking nonprofit that operates under Mercy Culture Church in Fort Worth.

A Republican, Schatzeline was elected in during the 2022 Texas House of Representatives election, defeating Democrat KC Chowdhury. He campaigned Christian conservative values and supported securing the border, law enforcement, and lowering taxes. Schatzeline supports looser gun laws, restricting abortion with exceptions when the mother's life is at risk. He opposes critical race theory. Schatzeline serves on the county affairs and criminal jurisprudence committees.  In 2023, Schatzline authored bill HB 1266 to restrict drag performances by amending the Texas business and commerce code. A 90-second video later surfaced of Schatzline dressed in drag while he was a student.

References 

Year of birth missing (living people)
21st-century American politicians
Politicians from Fort Worth, Texas
Republican Party members of the Texas House of Representatives